Ohmyia omya is a species of South American hoverfly.

References

Insects described in 1999
Diptera of South America
Taxa named by F. Christian Thompson
Eristalinae
Hoverfly genera